Ilkka Mikkola (born 18 January 1979) is a Finnish former professional ice hockey defenceman who most notably played for Oulun Kärpät of the Finnish Liiga.

Playing career
In the time of his 12 seasons in league, Mikkola has won eight championships, which is more than any active player in the league. 
In the 2004–2005 SM-liiga season, Mikkola was the best defenceman of the league and was also chosen to the SM-liiga All Star-game. Of the eight championships he has won four with Kärpät, one with Jokerit and three with TPS.

Including the eight championships in SM-liiga, Mikkola has also won gold medal in 1998 World Junior Ice Hockey Championships. He has also won silver medal in U18 European Championships.
Mikkola was drafted to NHL by Montreal Canadiens in third round as 65th overall in 1997 NHL Entry Draft.

Awards and honours

Oulun Kärpät retired Mikkola's number "6" in 2021.

Career statistics

Regular season and playoffs

International

References

External links
 

1976 births
People from Kiiminki
Finnish ice hockey defencemen
HC TPS players
Jokerit players
Living people
Lukko players
Montreal Canadiens draft picks
Oulun Kärpät players
Sportspeople from North Ostrobothnia